The following is an incomplete list of mountains in the People's Republic of China, sorted in alphabetical order. Some of these mountains  that are claimed by the PRC, including those under the control of the Republic of China and those disputed with other countries, such as Mount Everest, are noted after the list.

List

See also

 Geography of China
 Sacred Mountains of China
 Mountains of Southwest China

References

China

China
China
Mountains